Waldemar Björkstén (August 12, 1873 – May 31, 1933) was a Finnish sailor who competed in the 1912 Summer Olympics. He was a crew member of the Finnish boat Nina, which won the silver medal in the 10 metre class.

References

External links 
 
 

1873 births
1933 deaths
Finnish male sailors (sport)
Sailors at the 1912 Summer Olympics – 10 Metre
Olympic sailors of Finland
Olympic silver medalists for Finland
Olympic medalists in sailing
Medalists at the 1912 Summer Olympics